Abu Bakr Mohammed ibn Ali al Sanhaji al-Baydhaq (died after 1164) was a Moroccan historian mainly known as a companion of Ibn Tumart and chronicler of the Almohads. Al-Baydhaq (meaning pawn) was his nickname, because he was small in stature. He was from the tribe of Senhaja.

The title of his main work is: Al moqtabass min kitabi al anssab fi maärifati al ashab (written ca. 1150). It is the most important source on the period. Written in Classical Arabic, Berber words, names and sayings are used throughout the text, making it an important work for scholars of the medieval Berber language.

References

Akhbār al-Mahdī Ibn Tūmart wa-bidāyat dawlat al-Muwaḥḥidīn (or. text in Arabic) ed. Al-Ribā, 1971
Ed. in Algeria as: Kitāb Akhbār al-Mahdī ibn Tūmart (Algiers: al-Mu’assasa al-Waṭaniyya li-l-Kitāb, 1982)

External links
Al kindi catalogue 
An annotated guide to Arabic autobiographical writings (ninth to nineteenth centuries c.e.)

12th-century Berber people
12th-century Moroccan historians
Berber historians
Berber Moroccans
Moroccan autobiographers
Almohad historians
People from Tinmel
Sanhaja
12th-century historians of the medieval Islamic world